People in North Korea suffer political repression from every aspect of daily life, including speech, travel, employment, and religion. The Kim dynasty has ruled North Korea for three generations. It consolidates its supreme centralised power through the guidance of the political ideology of Juche and Songun. Juche is criticised by many scholars and is perceived as the practice of totalitarianism. Songun refers to 'military-first Policy', which means that the Korean People's Army has the highest political, economic, and resource-allocation priority, sacrificing other parts of society.

North Korea, as a one-party state, requires every citizen to memorise the details of Ten Principles for the Establishment of a Monolithic Ideological System compulsorily, as these principles ensure the absolute loyalty and obedience towards the Kim family. Additionally, detention, punishment in a prison camp, reported execution, and public execution applies if people's behaviours, actions, and consumption are not approved by the state or shows disrespect to the Kim family.

Juche ideology 

Juche ideology is developed by Kim Il-sung, which is perceived as a variant of Marxism–Leninism at the beginning and then gradually transforms to the ideology emphasising on "Political independence, Economic self-sustenance, and Self-reliance" after the speech given by Kim Il-sung on 14 April 1965.  Juche ideology greatly focuses on the leadership of masses, and the only man who will lead the masses to be successful is Kim Il-sung. This theory consolidates Kim Il-sung's supreme position over the Workers' Party and North Korea.

The theory describes the great leader as an "absolutist and supreme leader". The great leader has the highest wisdom and also the only human being who owns the legitimate representation to the working class. The great leader can realise the class conflicts, lead people to revolutionary changes and overcome the difficult tasks. Also, the great leader is a flawless human being who never commits mistakes and always has the power to rule the masses. Only the introduction of unitary ideology system can make the great leader theory function. The unitary ideology system is Ten Principles for a Monolithic Ideological System.

Political parties and elections 

The Supreme People's Assembly is the sole legislature in North Korea and holds the quinquennial elections to select the leading party and the top leader. Theoretically, there are three different parties including the Workers' Party of Korea, Korean Social Democratic Party and Chondoist Chongu Party, and few deputies from other organisations. But in practice, three parties are all nominated by Democratic Front for the Reunification of the Fatherland and the Workers' party is always expected to win. All citizens aged 17 and above have the mandatory obligation to vote. Joining the supporting groups and expressing the happiness of voting to the great leadership of the nation are expected after leaving the polling station. The elections are criticised as a show because the turnout rate is invariably around 100%. Citizens nominally have rights to vote against the candidate by crossing out the candidate name and drop the ballot paper into the separate box. However, the voting procedure is in an open environment and under the eye of officials. It is a risky action that secret police would tail after the person and suspect the disloyalty to the nation. For those who voted against may get the punishment in forms of losing houses and jobs. Workers' Party led by Kim family hold the majority of votes in every election and the Supreme People's Assembly determines its dominant political power over North Korea.

Secret police 

The secret police agency is an autonomous and separate agency which is attached to the State Security Department in North Korea. According to the testimony of a former secret police instructor Kong Thak-ho, the selection process of secret police is based on the loyalty to the ruling party and Kim family, but the specific skills regarding police work are least important. The potential candidates will be investigated through relative's six generations and there must be someone holding the important position. One of the main duties is to crackdown the political criminals who defy the Kim family and feel discontented with the regime. The secret police agency is authorised to go through special tribunal and report directly to Kim Jong-un. Also, secret police with a high ranking are responsible to censor all the publications in North Korea and grant approval. Another duty of secret police is to run the concentration camps in North Korea. They train the guards to maltreat the prisoners and guards will get punishment if they feel sympathy with the inmates' misfortune.

Religion 

North Korea official claims itself as atheistic. Religion in North Korea is hard to be observed by outsiders because of its extreme isolation from the world. Under the estimation carried out by Religious Intelligence UK, the majority of North Koreans are not religious. Korean shamanism and Chondoism are the main religions and Buddhism and Christianity are being the minority.

The table below illustrates the estimation of populations of religions in North Korea in the 2000s.

The Chondoist Chongu Party (Party of the Young Friends of the Heavenly Way) is the political embodiment of Chondoism, which is approved as the ' national religion' by the state. The official compliments the unique characteristics of Chondoism, complying with the features of communism as minjung (the mass) and revolutionary anti-imperialist. The development of Buddhism tradition in North Korea differs from the development in South Korea since the separation of the country. Buddhism activities are entirely funded and authorised by the official Korea Buddhist Federation. The religious activities in North Korea are inactive as the existing temples built in the past are protected as cultural heritage.

Christianity was widespread at the north part of Korea peninsula until the 19th century and Pyongyang was named as "Jerusalem of the East" which appeal to the majority of Christian before 1948. However, as the founding of the Democratic people's Republic of Korea in 1945, due to the close connection with America, Kim Il-sung criticised and discouraged Christianity. South Korea becomes the new destination for those who are afraid of being persecuted and then escape from the North.

According to the reference of Korean war and testimonies of defectors, some scholars argue that religion is entirely eliminated by the state because imperialists may take advantage of it to destabilise the regime and slow down the construction of communism. For the sake of survival, the new reality compels people to abandon the former religions. In this perspective, both Buddhism and Christianity have been deracinated and the reappearance of Korea Buddhist Federation and Korean Christian Federation after 1970 has no practical implications of the existence of religions. On the other hand, based on the evidence gathered, religions including communities of Buddhism and Christianity still survived and reappeared in the few decades. The possible reason is that the religious people also firmly believed in the value of communism in terms of Marxism–Leninism, and Kimilsungism (Juche), and showed the highest respect to the leadership.

Food allocation 
Since the 1990s, North Korea cannot allocate food to its citizens and it heavily relies on international food aid. Due to economic sanction started by America, North Korea is unable to import food and develop its agriculture technology. Compounding the mismanagement of resources and environment, the yield of food is insufficient to feed the people. Also, it is illegal for citizens to find food due to the limitation of movement. Those effects give rise to mass famine and starvation.

It is queried by Stephan Haggard and Marcus Noland that great food shortages in the 1990s could be avoided but the regime did not put the people's safety in priority and arbitrarily keep allocating the resources to the army. Adequate policy adjustments could have overcome great food shortages. The state refused to get aids from international humanitarian and passively conducted foreign relations.

Media 

Media is under the strictest control by the state and functions as political propaganda. Specific data and ranking given by the report, North Korea is ranked last out of 180 countries on the World Press Freedom Index 2018. All newspapers and broadcasters are owned by the government and the main focus is to consolidate the national unity and to ensure the absolute loyalty of Kim Jong-un, the third generation of Kim family. The Korean Central News Agency is the main news provider and the capital city Pyongyang has all publishing houses of 12 major newspapers including Rodong Sinmun and 20 periodicals. Moreover, every native journalist is the member of Workers' Party and native formal journalist regards foreign journalist as a 'liar' aiming to destabilise the government.

Also, using phones including mobile phones for communication and file transmission is only allowed in the national intranet which is entirely controlled and monitored by the government. North Koreans cannot access foreign media and information based on foreign outlets in any form of viewing, reading or listening, otherwise they will be sent to the concentration camp.

Official loyalty ranking of citizens 

Government assesses citizens on the basis of songbun and classifies them into roughly 50 sub-classifications under three main categories, which are testified by refugees and documents in North Korea. Personal behaviour, family background and relative's background in terms of political stance and socioeconomic status are key elements of assessing one's loyalty to the government and the great leader. Therefore, responsibility, educational and employment opportunity, and even adequate food will be allocated to an individual only if the individual is worth to trust, which is determined by the songbun. Also, a good songbun is a fundamental qualification for any individual who is willing to join the Workers' Party.

On the other hand, all citizens are equally treated according to the North Korean government which claims family background is never a basis for any discrimination.

Internment camp 

The State Security Department is in charge of the internment camp to imprison political offenders and people who are suspected of political unreliable. Until the near-abandonment of the principle in 1994, innocent people can be treated as a political criminal and interned if a convicted political criminals are their immediate family members. Central and northeastern North Korea become the concentrated region for internment camps, which contain about 80,000 to 120,000 political prisoners overall. In order to make sure the extreme isolation from the outside world, those camps are situated in the secluded mountain valleys. Many people die in the camp due to torture, starvation, unsanitary environment and working accident.

With the evidence given by the former prisoner and satellite images, the table below shows the six remaining internment camps in North Korea.

Yodok and Bukchang internment camps have different function and purpose. For the former, the camp is designed to imprison criminals for life imprisonment. The latter one is to lock up people who are given the lengthy jail term with little hope to be released.

The news report about political labour camp at Yodok, North Korea, states that landlords, purged party's official and the religiously actives are initially sent to the political prison and sentenced to hard labour. Once citizens are suspected of disrespectful or disloyalty to the leadership, guilty of political or ideological crimes, they are sent to the prisons as well. There are about 200,000 inmates in the North's network of political prisons and one of the former inmates noted that inmates are often get abused and starved and they are forced to watch the public execution of their fellow inmates.

References

 
Human rights abuses in North Korea
Persecution
Political repression
Politics of North Korea